NRK Stortinget (NRK Parliament) was a Norwegian digital radio channel operated by the Norwegian Broadcasting Corporation (NRK).

Created in 2000 to increase the transparency of political debate by providing an insight into the work of the Norwegian legislature, the Storting, it broadcast live parliamentary debates and other proceedings via DAB and on-line as well as using a part of the FM network around the larger cities. The transmissions via DAB ceased in 2007, and the service was later withdrawn in its entirety.

External links
NRK Stortinget

2000 establishments in Norway
2007 disestablishments in Norway
Legislature broadcasters
NRK
Storting
Radio stations established in 2000
Radio stations in Norway
Radio stations disestablished in 2007
Defunct mass media in Norway